Bergman Brook is a stream in the U.S. state of Minnesota.

Bergman Brook was named for a lumberman.

See also
List of rivers of Minnesota

References

Rivers of Aitkin County, Minnesota
Rivers of Kanabec County, Minnesota
Rivers of Minnesota